Sakrat Ruekthamrong is a Thai actor, and former model, airman, basketball player.

Early life
Ruekthamrong was born on 25 February 1963 in Phrae province, north of Thailand. He was raised by his grandmother as his parents split up when he was a child. Used to be a non-commissioned air force officer who graduated from Air Technical Training School in Bangkok. His highest rank was Sergeant (Sgt), during which time he was also an Air Force basketball player, including still being in the same company as famed football player Piyapong Pue-on.

Entertainment career
He has been in the entertainment industry since the '80s, starting from being a model and has been an actor without acting coach in many television series as well as movies.

Ruekthamrong often starred in movies and TV series directed by Bhandevanov Devakula on a regular basis.

Partal filmography
Film
Phi Liang (1988) as Chotiwan
Sherry Ann (2001) as Vichai Chanapanit
The Legend of King Naresuan The Great, Part II, Reclaiming Sovereignty (2007) as Lord Ram
Eternity (2010) as Thip
The Legend of King Naresuan The Great, Part III, Naval Battle (2011) as Lord Ram
The Outrage (2011) as King
Jan Dara the Beginning (2012) as Luang Vissanun-decha
Jan Dara: The Finale (2013) as Luang Vissanun-decha
Plae Kao (2014) as Headman Rueang
Mae Bia (2015) as Tim
Six Characters (2022) as Suriya
Television series
Lod Lai Mungkorn (Through The Dragon's Stripes) (1992) as Tian Suepanit
Sarawat Yai (1994 version) as Pol Capt Methee On-aen
Lueat Khao Ta (1995) as Inspector Amorn 
Hak Lin Chang (1996) as Somyot
San Ti Ban (1996)
See Pan Din (Four Reigns) (2004) as Luang Osot
Suphapburut Juthathep: Khun Chai Rachanon (Gentlemen of Juthathep: Khun Chai Juthathep) (2013) as Field Marshal Kraisorn Wongsawan
Lilawadee Plerng (The Secret Truth) (2015) as Songphol
Lueat Tat Lueat (2015) as Lu Fei
Sri Ayodhaya (2017–2020) as Phraya Pichai-chanrit
Ley Luang (2021) as Director Krit

References

External links 
 

Sakrat Ruekthamrong
Sakrat Ruekthamrong
Sakrat Ruekthamrong
Sakrat Ruekthamrong
Sakrat Ruekthamrong
Sakrat Ruekthamrong
Sakrat Ruekthamrong
1963 births
Living people